Hannah Britland (born 2 February 1990) is a British actress and model.

Career
In 2013, Britland played Charlie, the girlfriend of a drug dealer who ends up having a brief relationship with James Cook (Jack O'Connell) in two episodes of Skins. She also appeared in the third series of Fresh Meat where she played Sam, a young woman to whom both JP (Jack Whitehall) and Howard McGregor (Greg McHugh) are attracted.

That same year she got a small role as a BOAC stewardess in the movie Rush.

In 2014, she appeared in the Australian soap opera Home and Away.

As of 2018, she has quit acting and became a linguist. Britland has voiced her distaste for critics on her Instagram.

Filmography

Film

Television

References

External links

1990 births
Living people
British television actresses
21st-century British actresses
Actresses from Lancashire
21st-century English women
21st-century English people